The Spanish basketball league system is a series of connected competitions for professional basketball clubs in Spain. The system has a hierarchical format with a promotion and relegation system between competitions at different levels.

Men
There are currently four different nation-wide leagues in the system - the 1st tier Liga ACB, the 2nd tier LEB Oro, the 3rd tier LEB Plata and the 4th tier Liga EBA.

Liga ACB is organized by the Asociación de Clubs de Baloncesto (Basketball Clubs Association), which is a private organization. LEB leagues and Liga EBA are organized by the Spanish Basketball Federation while the lower tiers are organized by the regional federations.

Levels
For the 2018–19 season, the Spanish basketball league system is as follows:

Lower divisions
For the 2015–16 season, the lower divisions for each of the Autonomous Communities is as follows:

Evolution of the Spanish basketball league system

Other competitions
Spanish King's Cup
Spanish Supercup

Women
Since the 2001–02 season, there are currently different competitions on the pyramid.

 Liga Femenina de Baloncesto, organized by the Spanish Basketball Federation and composed by 14 teams.
 Liga Femenina 2, composed by 28 teams divided into two groups and also organized by the Spanish Basketball Federation.
 Primera División Femenina, where teams are divided into several inter-Regional groups. This competition is co-organized by the Regional Federations.
 Regional Leagues.

References and notes

External links
ACB League Official Website 
Spanish Basketball Federation 

 
Basketball league systems
Sports league systems in Spain